Soo-jin, also spelled Su-jin or Sue-jin, is a Korean unisex given name. Its meaning differs based on the hanja used to write each syllable of the name. There are 67 hanja with the reading "soo" and 48 hanja with the reading "jin" on the South Korean government's official list of hanja which may be registered for use in given names. Soo-jin was the fifth-most popular name for baby girls in South Korea in 1980, third-most popular in 1988, and fifth-most popular again in 1990.

People with this name include:

Artists and musicians
Kang Sue-jin (born 1967), South Korean female ballerina
Yoo Chae-yeong (birth name Kim Soo-jin; 1974–2014), South Korean female pop singer
Seomoon Tak (born Lee Su-jin, 1978), South Korean female rock singer
Horan (singer) (born Choi Soo-jin, 1979), South Korean electropop singer
Soojin (singer) (born Seo Soo-jin, 1998), South Korean female pop singer, former member of (G)I-DLE

Film and television personalities
Kang Soo-jin (voice actor) (born 1965), South Korean voice actor
Kim Soo-jin (actress) (born 1974), South Korean actress
Su-chin Pak (born 1976), South Korean-born American female news reporter
Lee Su-jin (director) (born 1977), South Korean male film director
Chae Min-seo (born Jo Soo-jin, 1981), South Korean actress
Park Soo-jin (born 1985), South Korean actress
Kyung Soo-jin (born 1987), South Korean actress
Jeon Soo-jin (born 1988), South Korean actress
Kang Soo-jin (voice actress) (fl. 1990s), South Korean voice actress
Choi Soo-jin (fl. 1990s and 2000s), South Korean voice actress

Sportspeople
Noh Soo-jin (born 1962), South Korean male football player
Wang Su-jin (born 1973), South Korean female basketball player
Kim Su-jin (swimmer) (born 1974), South Korean female swimmer
Shin Soo-jin (born 1982), South Korean male football player
Yang Soo-jin (born 1988), South Korean female modern pentathlete
Kim Su-jin (curler) (born 1999), South Korean female curler
Shin Soo-jin (equestrian), South Korean male dressage rider, gold medalist in equestrian at the 2006 Asian Games – Team dressage

See also
List of Korean given names

References

Korean unisex given names